Carla Andrea Amtmann Fecci (born 27 July 1987) is a Chilean politician. She is the current mayor of Valdivia and also was president of the Pontifical Catholic University of Valparaíso Students Federation.

Early life
Born in Valdivia, Amtmann is the daughter of the scholar Ester Aurora Fecci Pérez and of Carlos Alberto Amtmann Moyano, also a scholar and former head of the Austral University of Chile. She finished her secondary education at Colegio Domus-Mater de Valdivia.

In 2012, Amtmann finished his BA and received herself as a Professor of History, Geography, and Social Sciences at his alma Pontificia Universidad Católica de Valparaíso (PUCV). Similarly, she has a master in Applied Economics in Public Policy at the Alberto Hurtado University as well as an International Policy and Economic Development at the Fordham University.

Political career
From 2008 to 2009, Amtmann was president of the Pontifical Catholic University of Valparaíso Students Federation.

In the 2017 Chilean general election, she ran for a seat in the deputy for the 24th District. Nevertheless, she wasn't elected.

Four years later, in the 2021 Chilean municipal elections, she ran for mayor of the Valdivia municipality. In the elections, she obtained 49% of the votes.

References

External links
 

1987 births
Living people
People from Valdivia
Chilean historians
Chilean people of German descent
Presidents of the Pontifical Catholic University of Valparaíso Student Federation
Pontifical Catholic University of Valparaíso alumni
Alberto Hurtado University alumni
Fordham University alumni
Mayors of places in Chile
Women mayors of places in Chile
Democratic Revolution politicians
21st-century Chilean politicians
21st-century Chilean women politicians